The 2004–05 season was the 93rd season in the history of Cambridge United F.C., and the club's final season in the Football League after a 35-year stay since their initial election in 1970. As well as relegation to the Football Conference for the first time in the club's history, the club was in disarray off the pitch, entering administration and selling their Abbey Stadium home.

Background

Cambridge United were founded in 1912 as Abbey United, named after the Abbey district of Cambridge. For many years they played amateur football until their election to the Football League in 1970. The early 1990s was Cambridge's most successful period; managed by John Beck the club won the first ever play-off final at Wembley Stadium and gained promotion from the Fourth Division before reaching two successive FA Cup quarter finals in 1990 and 1991 and winning the Third Division in 1991. The club reached the play-offs in 1992 but failed in their bid to become founder members of the Premier League. This was the club's highest final league placing to date and since then it has been in almost constant decline.

The following season the club sacked Beck and were relegated from the First Division. Further relegation followed two seasons later. United returned briefly to Division Two but were relegated in 2002. After struggling in League Two, the best Cambridge fans were hoping for during the season was to avoid relegation and the financial trouble that would bring.

Match results

League results

League Cup

FA Cup

League table

See also 
2004–05 in English football
2004–05 Football League Two

References

Cambridge United F.C. seasons
Cambridge United